Dice's cottontail (Sylvilagus dicei) is a species of cottontail rabbit in the family Leporidae. It is found in Costa Rica and Panama, in páramo and cloud forest habitats.

Taxonomy
Dice's cottontail was first described by William P. Harris, Jr., in 1932. It was at one time thought to be a subspecies of the common tapetí or forest cottontail (Sylvilagus brasiliensis) but is now recognised as a separate species.

Description
Dice's cottontail is one of the larger cottontail rabbits. Its back is dappled black and brown and its flanks greyish-black. The blackish tail is tiny and the underparts are dull white. It has a brown patch on its throat.

Distribution and habitat
Dice's cottontail is endemic to the Cordillera de Talamanca which straddles the border between Panama and Costa Rica. Its habitat is Alpine meadows and Páramo grasslands above the tree line.

Status
The IUCN lists Dice's cottontail in its Red Book of Endangered Species as "Data Deficient" as the species has been little studied and its population trend is unknown, but in 1996, it was listed as "Endangered". The IUCN has identified a number of threats that it may face. Coyotes have become established in the area and may prey on it, and other predators may also be on the increase. Degradation of the forest land is taking place as trees are cut down and the land turned to pasture. Fire is also a concern because the local inhabitants regularly burn the land for range control and this may result in loss of grass for forage and loss of suitable vegetation cover in which the cottontail can lie up by day. These factors are causing the animal's range to contract upward into the mountains; this area is a national park, which should provide some protection to the species.

References

Sylvilagus
Mammals of Central America
Mammals described in 1832
Páramo fauna
Taxonomy articles created by Polbot